This is a list of universities in the United Kingdom (alphabetical by substantive name). Below that are lists of university colleges and other recognised bodies (institutions with degree awarding powers), followed by a list of defunct institutions.

Universities alphabetically 

This list follows the list of recognised bodies on the UK government website. All the institutions on this list are recognised bodies with university status, indicated either by their use of university title in their name on the recognised bodies list or by reference to the Office for Students database for the few universities that do not use the title in their name. Member institutions of the University of London are listed here if they hold university status.

University of Aberdeen
Abertay University, Dundee
Aberystwyth University
Anglia Ruskin University, Cambridge, Chelmsford, Peterborough and London
Arden University, private, distance learning & blended learning, London, Birmingham, Manchester, Berlin
Aston University, Birmingham
Bangor University
University of Bath
Bath Spa University
University of Bedfordshire, Luton and Bedford
University of Birmingham
Birmingham City University
University College Birmingham
Bishop Grosseteste University, Lincoln
University of Bolton
The Arts University Bournemouth
Bournemouth University
BPP University, private
University of Bradford
University of Brighton
University of Bristol
Brunel University, Uxbridge and London
University of Buckingham, private
Buckinghamshire New University, High Wycombe

University of Cambridge
Canterbury Christ Church University, Canterbury, Thanet, Tunbridge Wells and Chatham
Cardiff Metropolitan University (formerly University of Wales Institute Cardiff)
Cardiff University
University of Chester, Chester and Warrington
University of Chichester
Coventry University, including CU Coventry, CU Scarborough and CU London
Cranfield University
University for the Creative Arts, Canterbury, Epsom, Farnham, Maidstone and Rochester
University of Cumbria, Carlisle (main campus), London, Lancaster, Penrith and Ambleside
De Montfort University, Leicester
University of Derby
University of Dundee

Durham University, Durham and Stockton-on-Tees (Queen's Campus)

University of East Anglia, Norwich
University of East London
Edge Hill University, Ormskirk, Lancashire

University of Edinburgh
Edinburgh Napier University
University of Essex, Colchester and Southend-on-Sea
University of Exeter
Falmouth University
University of Glasgow
Glasgow Caledonian University
University of Gloucestershire, Cheltenham, Gloucester and London
University of Greenwich
Harper Adams University, Newport, Shropshire
Hartpury University, Gloucestershire
Heriot-Watt University, Edinburgh and Galashiels
University of Hertfordshire, Hatfield
University of the Highlands & Islands, Inverness (main campus), Elgin, Perth & across north and western Scotland
University of Huddersfield, Huddersfield & Barnsley
University of Hull

Imperial College London 
Keele University, Staffordshire
University of Kent, Canterbury and Medway
Kingston University
University of Central Lancashire, Preston and Burnley
Lancaster University

University of Leeds
Leeds Arts University
Leeds Beckett University
Leeds Trinity University
University of Leicester
University of Lincoln, Lincoln, Riseholme and Holbeach
University of Liverpool
Liverpool Hope University
Liverpool John Moores University
University of London 
London Metropolitan University
London School of Economics
London South Bank University

Loughborough University
University of Manchester
Manchester Metropolitan University
Middlesex University, London
Newcastle University
Newman University, Birmingham
University of Northampton
Northeastern University – London
Northumbria University, Newcastle upon Tyne
Norwich University of the Arts
University of Nottingham
Nottingham Trent University
The Open University, Milton Keynes (an open-access distance learning university)
University of Oxford
Oxford Brookes University
Plymouth Marjon University (formerly the University of St Mark & St John)
Arts University Plymouth
University of Plymouth
University of Portsmouth
Queen Margaret University, Edinburgh
Queen's University Belfast
Ravensbourne University London

University of Reading
Regent's University London
Richmond American University London
The Robert Gordon University, Aberdeen
Roehampton University, London
Royal Agricultural University, Cirencester
Royal Holloway, University of London
University of Salford
University of Sheffield
Sheffield Hallam University
University of South Wales, merger of University of Wales, Newport and University of Glamorgan
University of Southampton
Solent University, Southampton

University of St Andrews
St George's, University of London
St Mary's University, Twickenham
Staffordshire University, Stoke-on-Trent, Stafford and Lichfield
University of Stirling, Bridge of Allan

University of Strathclyde, Glasgow
University of Suffolk, Ipswich, Bury St Edmunds, Great Yarmouth, Lowestoft
University of Sunderland
University of Surrey, Guildford
University of Sussex, Brighton
Swansea University
Teesside University, Middlesbrough and Darlington

University of the Arts London
Ulster University, Coleraine, Jordanstown, Magee and Belfast
University of Law
University of Wales
University of Wales, Trinity Saint David (UWTSD), Lampeter, Carmarthen and Swansea
University of Warwick, Coventry
University of the West of England, Bristol
University of the West of Scotland, Paisley, Hamilton, Ayr & Dumfries
University of West London, Ealing and Brentford
University of Westminster, London
University of Winchester
University of Wolverhampton
University of Worcester
Wrexham Glyndŵr University
University of York
York St John University

University colleges
This is a list of university colleges in the UK. Institutions included on this list are university colleges that are recognised bodies with their own degree awarding powers; it does not include institutions with "university college" in their title that are listed bodies as parts of a university (see colleges within universities in the United Kingdom), or other institutions with "university college" in their title. Separate citations are given for institutions that have been awarded university college title recently and are not yet shown under that name on the recognised bodies list or which do not use the title in their name.

AECC University College
London Institute of Banking and Finance
University College of Estate Management, Reading
University College of Osteopathy, London
Writtle University College

Member institutions of the University of London

All member institutions of the University of London are recognised bodies as institutions that have the right to grant University of London degrees. Some also hold their own degree awarding powers and, since the passing of the University of London Act 2018, can apply for  university status in their own right without leaving the federal university.  Member institutions that are also universities in their own right are listed both here and in the list of universities above.

Birkbeck, University of London
City, University of London
Royal Central School of Speech and Drama
Courtauld Institute of Art
Goldsmiths, University of London
Institute of Cancer Research
King's College London
London Business School
London School of Economics and Political Science
London School of Hygiene and Tropical Medicine
Queen Mary, University of London
Royal Academy of Music
Royal Holloway, University of London
Royal Veterinary College
St George's, University of London
School of Oriental and African Studies
University College London

Other recognised bodies
This section lists other education institutions that hold their own degree awarding powers but are neither universities (or colleges of the University of London) nor university colleges.
 Ashridge Executive Education
 British and Irish Modern Music Institute
 Dyson Institute of Engineering and Technology
 Guildhall School of Music and Drama
 Liverpool School of Tropical Medicine
 London Interdisciplinary School
 NCG (Newcastle College Group)
 Multiverse Group Ltd
 Norland College
 Presbyterian Theological Faculty, Ireland (Union Theological College)
 Richmond, The American International University in London
 Rose Bruford College of Theatre and Performance
 Royal College of Music
 Royal College of Art
 Royal Conservatoire of Scotland
 Royal Northern College of Music
 Trinity Laban Conservatoire of Music and Dance

Recognised bodies that can only award foundation degrees
These institutions are recognised bodies with foundation degree awarding powers only.
 Blackpool and The Fylde College
 Cornwall College Group
 Grimsby Institute of Higher Education
 Hull College
 Leeds City College
 New College, Durham
 Newcastle College (part of NCG, above)
 Warwickshire College

Defunct university institutions
This section lists defunct universities, university colleges, polytechnics and colleges of federal universities.

University of Durham:
Armstrong College, Durham – Merged with University of Durham College of Medicine to form King's College, Durham (now Newcastle University)
University of Durham College of Medicine – Merged with Armstrong College, Durham to form King's College, Durham (now Newcastle University)
Fraserburgh University, Aberdeenshire (1592–1605)
University of Glamorgan, Cardiff, Trefforest and Glyntaff – Merged with University of Wales, Newport to form University of South Wales
King's College, Aberdeen – Merged with Marischal College, Aberdeen to form University of Aberdeen
 University of London:
 Bedford College, London – Merged with Royal Holloway College to form Royal Holloway and Bedford New College (now Royal Holloway, University of London)
 Heythrop College – closed 2018
 Westfield College, London – Merged with Queen Mary, University of London
 Wye College – Merged with Imperial College
London Guildhall University – Merged with University of North London to form London Metropolitan University

University of Manchester Institute of Science and Technology (UMIST) – Merged to form University of Manchester
Marischal College, Aberdeen (1593–1858) – Merged with King's College, Aberdeen to form University of Aberdeen
Mason Science College, Birmingham – Merged to form Mason College, now the University of Birmingham
University of North London – Merged with London Guildhall University to form London Metropolitan University
University of Northampton (1261–1265) (not to be confused with the current University of Northampton, which has no direct connection with the medieval foundation)
Queen's University of Ireland, Belfast, Cork and Galway – Closed, replaced by Royal University of Ireland
Royal University of Ireland, Belfast, Cork and Galway – Closed, replaced by National University of Ireland
University College Salford – Merged with the University of Salford
University College Scarborough – taken over by University of Hull
University of Stamford (1333-1335)
Federal University of Surrey – Divided into University of Surrey and Roehampton University
Surrey Institute of Art & Design, University College, Farnham and Epsom – Merged to form University for the Creative Arts
Swansea Metropolitan University – Merged with University of Wales Trinity Saint David
Trinity University College, Carmarthen – Merged with University of Wales, Lampeter to form University of Wales Trinity Saint David
Ulster Polytechnic – Merged with New University of Ulster to form University of Ulster
New University of Ulster – Merged with Ulster Polytechnic to form University of Ulster
Victoria University, Manchester, Liverpool and Leeds – Merged with Owen's College, Manchester, to form Victoria University of Manchester; Other colleges become University of Leeds and University of Liverpool
Victoria University of Manchester – Merged to form Manchester University
 University of Wales:
University of Wales College of Medicine, Cardiff – merged with Cardiff University
University of Wales Institute of Science and Technology, Cardiff – Merged with University of Wales College Cardiff to form University of Wales, Cardiff (now Cardiff University)
University of Wales Lampeter – Merged with Trinity University College to form University of Wales Trinity Saint David
University of Wales, Newport – Merged with University of Glamorgan to form University of South Wales

Foreign universities with campuses in the United Kingdom

While based in the UK, these are not considered UK universities and are not recognised as UK degree-awarding bodies by the British government unless separately listed in one of the categories above.

There are 40 "Overseas Higher Education Institutions" that have been approved for student visa purposes by the UK Government as offering "an overseas course of degree level study that's equal to a UK higher education course". There are also two branches of overseas universities that are "listed bodies", offering courses leading to a UK degree from a "registered body". The following are approved overseas higher education institutions and foreign universities that are listed bodies in the UK, with their UK locations:

 Advanced Studies in England Ltd, Bath
 American University of the Caribbean, Southall
 Amity University [IN] London, London (listed body providing courses leading to UK degrees from the University of Northampton and the University of Bolton)
 Arcadia University, Holborn
 Boston University London Programme, London
 Central University of Iowa, London
 Centre for Medieval and Renaissance Studies, Oxford
 Florida State University International Programs Association UK, London
 Fordham University, London
 Georgetown University (USA) UK Initiatives Organisation, London
 Girne American University Canterbury, Canterbury
 Global Education Oregon in London, London
 Grinnell College (Grinnell-in-London), London
 Harding University, London
 Harlaxton College, Grantham (part of the University of Evansville)
 Hollins University, London
 Bader International Study Centre, Hailsham (part of Queen's University at Kingston in Canada)
 Irish School of Ecumenics, Trinity College Dublin, Belfast
 Ithaca College, London
 James Madison University, London
 Lawrence University London Centre
 Limkokwing University of Creative Technology, London
 Luther College Study Centre, Nottingham
 MUN (UK) Ltd, Old Harlow (part of Memorial University)
 NYU in London, London
 Northeastern University – London (part of Northeastern University in the US)
 Pepperdine University UK Ltd, London
 Randolph College, Reading
 Samford University London Study Centre, London
 St George's International School of Medicine Ltd, Winchester
 St Cloud State University, Alnwick
 St. Lawrence University (USA) London Programme, London
 Stetson College of Law Autumn in London Program, London
 Syracuse University London Program, London
 Teikyo University of Japan in Durham, Durham
 The Aga Khan University (International) in the United Kingdom, London
 University of Chicago Booth School of Business, London
 University of North Carolina, London
 University of Notre Dame, London
 Valparaiso University Study Center, Cambridge
 Wisconsin in Scotland Trust, Dalkeith (part of University of Wisconsin, River Falls)
 Wroxton College of Fairleigh Dickinson University, Banbury

Universities in British Overseas Territories
Universities in British Overseas Territories are not considered UK Universities and are not recognised as UK degree-awarding bodies by the British government.

University of the West Indies Open Campus, with one country site in each of Anguilla, British Virgin Islands, Cayman Islands, Montserrat, and Turks and Caicos Islands.

Anguilla
Saint James School of Medicine

Bermuda
Bermuda College

Cayman Islands

Truman Bodden Law School: A law school affiliated with the University of Liverpool in the UK
International College of the Cayman Islands: A private university
St. Matthews University: A private institution containing a medical school and a veterinary school
University College of the Cayman Islands: The only public university in the Cayman Islands

Gibraltar
University of Gibraltar

Montserrat
University of Science, Arts and Technology
American University of the Caribbean

Turks and Caicos Islands
Charisma University

Universities in Crown Dependencies
See list of universities in the Isle of Man for university institutions on the Isle of Man. There are currently no universities in the Channel Islands; in 2013 the States of Guernsey gave approval for the opening of a university there but, as of February 2017, no progress has been made on the project.

See also
 Armorial of UK universities
 Colleges within universities in the United Kingdom
 List of colleges in the United Kingdom offering higher education courses
 List of universities in the United Kingdom by endowment
 List of universities in the United Kingdom by enrolment
 List of universities in the United Kingdom by date of foundation
 List of universities in England
 List of universities in Northern Ireland
 List of universities in Scotland
 List of universities in Wales* 
 Lists of universities and colleges
 Lists of universities and colleges by country
 Levels of education: higher education, foundation degree and further education
 National Union of Students of the United Kingdom
 Rankings of universities in the United Kingdom
 Tuition fees in the United Kingdom
 UCAS (Universities & Colleges Admissions Service)
 Universities in the United Kingdom

Notes

References

External links

 
Universities
United Kingdom
United Kingdom